Ali Sara (also Romanized as ‘Alī Sarā) is a village in Khaleh Sara Rural District, Asalem District, Talesh County, Gilan Province, Iran. At the 2006 census, its population was 251, in 61 families.

References 

Populated places in Talesh County